State Route 109 (SR 109) is a  state highway in Houston County in the southeastern part of the U.S. state of Alabama. The southern terminus of the highway is at the Florida state line, where it serves as a continuation of State Road 77 (SR 77). The northern terminus of the highway is at an intersection with U.S. Route 231 (US 231) north of Madrid.

Route description

SR 109 is routed along a two-lane road for its entire length. It serves as a connecting route between Graceville, Florida and Dothan, Alabama.

Major intersections

See also

References

109
Transportation in Houston County, Alabama